Vidal Basco Mamani (born 8 February 1996) is a Bolivian long-distance runner. He won a bronze medal in the 10,000 metres at the 2019 South American Championships. He currently holds national records in the 5000 and 10,000 metres.

International competitions

Personal bests
Outdoor
3000 metres – 8:32.11 (Santa Cruz 2018)
5000 metres – 13:57.80 (Lima 2019) NR
10,000 metres – 28:34.37 (Lima 2019) NR

References

1996 births
Living people
Bolivian male long-distance runners
Athletes (track and field) at the 2018 South American Games
People from Cercado Province (Oruro)
Athletes (track and field) at the 2019 Pan American Games
Pan American Games competitors for Bolivia